Houtouwan is an abandoned fishing village on the northern side of Shengshan Island, one of the Shengsi Islands, a chain of 400 islands located  east of Shanghai, China.

The village was once home to more than 2,000 fishermen, but was almost completely abandoned in the early 1990s due to problems with education and food delivery. Since its abandonment, the once-bustling village has been overtaken by greenery. Today the village is home to only a handful of people, but is a popular tourist attraction.

References

Former villages
Villages in China
Ghost towns in China